The 2017–18 WHL season is the 52nd season of the Western Hockey League (WHL). The regular season began on September 22, 2017 and ended on March 18, 2018. 

The playoffs began shortly after the end of the regular season on March 22, 2018, and ended on May 13; the winning team, the Swift Current Broncos, were awarded the Ed Chynoweth Cup and a berth in the 2018 Memorial Cup held at the Brandt Centre in Regina, Saskatchewan from May 18–27, 2018. The Regina Pats automatically qualified for the tournament as hosts.

Standings
Updated to game(s) played on March 18, 2018. Source: Western Hockey League

Note: GP = Games played; W = Wins; L = Losses; OTL = Overtime losses; SL = Shootout losses; GF = Goals for; GA = Goals against; PTS = Points; x = clinched playoff berth; y = clinched division title; z = clinched conference title

Statistical leaders

Scoring leaders 

Players are listed by points, then goals.

Note: GP = Games played; G = Goals; A = Assists; Pts. = Points; PIM = Penalty minutes

Goaltenders 
These are the goaltenders that lead the league in GAA that have played at least 1800 minutes.

Note: GP = Games played; Mins = Minutes played; W = Wins; L = Losses; OTL = Overtime losses; SOL = Shootout losses; SO = Shutouts; GAA = Goals against average; Sv% = Save percentage

2018 WHL playoffs

Conference Quarter-finals

Eastern Conference

(E1) Moose Jaw Warriors vs. (W2) Prince Albert Raiders

(E2) Swift Current Broncos vs. (E3) Regina Pats

(C1) Medicine Hat Tigers vs. (W1) Brandon Wheat Kings

(C2) Lethbridge Hurricanes vs. (C3) Red Deer Rebels

Western Conference

(U1) Everett Silvertips vs. (W2) Seattle Thunderbirds

(U2) Portland Winterhawks vs. (U3) Spokane Chiefs

(B1) Kelowna Rockets vs. (W1) Tri-City Americans

(B2) Victoria Royals vs. (B3) Vancouver Giants

Conference Semi-finals

Eastern Conference

(E1) Moose Jaw Warriors vs. (E2) Swift Current Broncos

(C2) Lethbridge Hurricanes vs. (W1) Brandon Wheat Kings

Western Conference

(U1) Everett Silvertips vs. (U2) Portland Winterhawks 

* Note: Game 4 was played at Moda Center.

(B2) Victoria Royals vs. (W1) Tri-City Americans

Conference Finals

Eastern Conference

(E2) Swift Current Broncos vs. (C2) Lethbridge Hurricanes

Western Conference

(U1) Everett Silvertips vs. (W1) Tri-City Americans

WHL Championship

(E2) Swift Current Broncos vs. (U1) Everett Silvertips

Playoff scoring leaders
Note: GP = Games played; G = Goals; A = Assists; Pts = Points; PIM = Penalty minutes

Playoff leading goaltenders
Note: GP = Games played; Mins = Minutes played; W = Wins; L = Losses; GA = Goals Allowed; SO = Shutouts; SV& = Save percentage; GAA = Goals against average

WHL awards

All-Star Teams

Eastern Conference

Western Conference

See also 
 2018 Memorial Cup
 List of WHL seasons
 2017–18 OHL season
 2017–18 QMJHL season
 2017 in ice hockey
 2018 in ice hockey

References

External links 

 Official website of the Western Hockey League
 Official website of the Canadian Hockey League
 Official website of the MasterCard Memorial Cup
 Official website of the Subway Super Series

Western Hockey League seasons
Whl
WHL